Salvatore John Giovanni La Puma  (February 21, 1929 – May 8, 2008) was an Italian American short story writer.

Life
He was born and raised in Bensonhurst, Brooklyn. In 1951, he was drafted, and served in the Korea War as a medic.  In 1959, he moved to Westchester, and worked as an advertising copy editor. In 1967, he moved to Santa Barbara, California.
He married Linda Ferrara in 1955; they had six children; they divorced in 1977; he married Joan Dewberry in 1980; they divorced in 2000.

His work appeared in Antioch Review, Kenyon Review. and Zyzzyva. He died in Santa Barbara on May 8, 2008.

Awards
 1987 Flannery O'Connor Award for Short Fiction
 1988 O. Henry Award finalist 
 1988 American Book Award

Works

Anthologies

References

American short story writers
American military personnel of the Korean War
American writers of Italian descent
People from Bensonhurst, Brooklyn
1929 births
2008 deaths
American Book Award winners